Robin Howard Chapple (born 11 February 1947) is an Australian politician.

From 2001 to 2005 Chapple represented the Mining and Pastoral Region for the Greens. He was defeated in the 2005 state election but was re-elected in the 2008 election, serving until his retirement in 2021.

Chapple was Greens spokesperson for aboriginal issues, energy and climate change, local government, mines and petroleum, nuclear issues, pastoral issues, ports, racing and gaming, regional sustainability, state development and industry, and waste management.

Early life

Chapple was born in Wheathampstead, England in 1947. In his youth, he worked as a junior stockbroker at the London Stock Exchange, as a qualified automotive mechanical engineer in the British sports automotive industry, and in industrial farming industries in England. He later travelled to work with Oxfam in what is now Bangladesh.

Chapple emigrated to Australia in 1974 and worked throughout the Central Desert area and northern Australia in a number of engineering and surveying roles, living and working with remote Indigenous communities. He briefly worked for the state Water Authority and then eventually moved to Port Hedland to work for BHP.

Politics and activism

Chapple served as a town councillor on Port Hedland council for seven years from 1986 to 1993. Whilst on council, he served as a delegate to both the state Municipal Association and the Country Shire Councils Association.

Chapple was the co founder of LEAF (Local Environment Affinity Force) of Hedland, a local environment group who took an active role in paper recycling, tree planting and commenting on environment and development issues in the region. He established Chapple Research, a consultancy firm, to provide the local community, authorities and industries with environmental and social impact information and advice. He has also participated in campaigns for the protection of the Murujuga or Burrup Peninsula and the surrounding Dampier Archipelago from encroaching industrial and processing developments, and against uranium mining, uranium ore transportation and nuclear waste storage in Western Australia and in particular the proposed Pangea international nuclear waste dump, having served as the co-ordinator of the Anti-Nuclear Alliance of Western Australia. He is also an advocate for the introduction of limited voluntary euthanasia, having introduced bills to legalise the act in state parliament in 2002 and 2009 which were both defeated.

Chapple served as a member of the Department of Minerals and Energy's Minerals Environmental Liaison Committee (MELC) and on the state government's mining industries annual "Golden Gecko Environmental Excellence Award" program, as a conservation representative on the technical review and assessment panel.

Before entering parliament, Chapple worked as a research officer for Greens MLC Giz Watson.

References

External links
Website of Robin Chapple MLC
Greens WA
Biography and Speeches at the Parliament of Western Australia 

1947 births
Living people
Australian Greens members of the Parliament of Western Australia
Members of the Western Australian Legislative Council
People from Wheathampstead
English emigrants to Australia
Western Australian local councillors
21st-century Australian politicians